Yacuiba is a city in southern Bolivia and the capital city of Gran Chaco Province in the Tarija Department. It lies three kilometers from the Argentine border. Yacuiba is one of the cities of fast growth population in Bolivia due to the commerce and boom in hydrocarbon exploitation. It was part of Salta Province of Argentina until its cession to Bolivia in 1900.

Due to its position on the frontier, Yacuiba is a major center of commerce. Across the border lies Salvador Mazza, with which it forms a conurbation.

The town has direct connections by road with both Tarija and Santa Cruz. It also has an international airport (BYC). Although, Yacuiba has still a low population it managed to obtain one football team in the Bolivian professional league, Petrolero.

Climate

Yacuiba has a dry-winter humid subtropical climate (Köppen: Cwa), a result of its slightly cooler temperatures when compared to surrounding regions because of its modest elevation and the monsoonal effects of the surrounding area.

Etymology
The city's name is derived from the Guaraní yaku-iba, meaning roughly "fowls' watering hole"

References

External links
 Official tourism and commerce portal
 Traditional clothing
 Traditional music

Populated places in Tarija Department
Argentina–Bolivia border crossings